Spirit Rangers is an animated preschool streaming television series created by Karissa Valencia, who is of Mexican and Chumash heritage. Co-produced by Netflix Animation, Laughing Wild and Superprod Studio, the series was released on Netflix on October 10, 2022, before Indigenous Peoples' Day. On January 18, 2023, it was announced the series was renewed for a second season.

Premise
The show centers on Native American siblings Kodi, Summer and Eddy Skycedar who have the power to teleport into a magical spirit dimension in their Californian national park while also transforming into a grizzly bear cub, red-tailed hawk and a turtle respectively to complete missions.

Voice cast
 Wačíŋyeya Iwáš'aka Yracheta as Kodi Skycedar
 Isis Celilo Rogers as Summer Skycedar
 Talon Proc Alford as Eddy Skycedar
 Cree Summer as DeeDee and Lizard
 Shaun Taylor-Corbett as Coyote
 Wes Studi and Tantoo Cardinal as Sunny and Moon
 Román Zaragoza as Miy the Wolf Spirit
 Kimberly Norris Guerrero as Mom
 John Timothy as Dad

Episodes

Season 1 (2022)

Production
The series was announced in October 2020 alongside Ridley Jones and Dino Daycare, with the latter's production being canceled in April 2022.

Production of the series featured a writer's room that was staffed entirely by Indigenous Americans. Valencia also consulted Chumash and Cowlitz tribes around content.

Release
Spirit Rangers premiered on October 10, 2022, globally on Netflix. A trailer was released on September 23.

References

External links
 
 

2022 American television series debuts
2020s American animated television series
2020s American children's comedy television series
2020s preschool education television series
American children's animated adventure television series
American children's animated comedy television series
American children's animated fantasy television series
American computer-animated television series
American preschool education television series
Animated preschool education television series
English-language Netflix original programming
Netflix children's programming
Parallel universes in fiction
Television shows about Native Americans
Animated television series about bears
Animated television series about birds
Animated television series about children
Television series about turtles
Television series about shapeshifting
Television series by Netflix Animation
Native American television series